Ostgut Ton (also known as Ostgut Tonträger) was a German record label owned by the club Berghain in Berlin. Resident Advisor described it "a dominant force in dance music, beloved for its mix series and dozens of EPs, albums and compilations."

The label's first releases were by Berghain/Panorama Bar residents such as André Galluzzi, Cassy, and Ben Klock.

Amongst the producers that have released for the label are André Galluzzi, Ben Klock, Cassy, Edit-Select, Len Faki, Luke Slater, Marcel Dettmann, Marcel Fengler, Murat Tepeli, My My, Nick Höppner, Paul Brtschitsch, Prosumer, Samuli Kemppi, Shed, Tama Sumo, Tobias Freund, Tim Paris, and Vatican Shadow.

Ostgut Ton closed in December 2021.

References

External links
 Official site
 Berghain site
 Resident Advisor reviews
 Talking Shopcast with Ostgut Ton: interview with Nick Höppner
 Ostgut Ton special on the Rob da Banks Show
 Berghain announces ballet project, MASSE: Interview with Jenus Baumecker-Kahmke

German record labels
Record labels established in 2005
Techno record labels